Ahmed Husam (born 14 November 1995 in Th.Kibidhoo, Maldives) is a Maldivian swimmer. At the 2012 Summer Olympics, he competed in the Men's 100 metre freestyle, finishing in 53rd place overall in the heats, failing to qualify for the semifinals.

References

External links
 

Maldivian male freestyle swimmers
1995 births
Living people
Olympic swimmers of the Maldives
Swimmers at the 2012 Summer Olympics
20th-century Maldivian people
21st-century Maldivian people